Love Life 2 is the ninth studio album by Japanese singer-songwriter Hitomi, released on June 24, 2009, by Hitomi's sub-label of Avex Trax, Love Life Records. It was originally to be released June 10, 2009, but was pushed back for promotional reasons. The first pressing of the album came with an external bonus, a poster. An accompanying photobook of the same name, that shows the singer completely nude, was released on the same day.

Album history
On July 11, 2008, Hitomi revealed on her blog that she remarried, on June 30, 2008, and was pregnant. She also announced this during the a-nation concert in Ajinomoto Stadium on August 30, 2008. Earlier that August, Hitomi released a new digital single called "Fight for Your Run☆". A limited edition was released on August 20, 2008, and the other edition was released on August 27, 2008. Hitomi gave birth to a baby girl on December 23, 2008. It is during this time, and possibly some time before, that the concept and planning for "Love Life 2" began. The album covers, promotional shots, and some of the music videos are also thought to have been done during this time. The album was officially announced as "Love Life 2" on Hitomi's website on May 22, 2009, two days after the release of her 34th single, "World! Wide! Love!".

Track listing

Charts
Oricon Sales Chart (Japan)

References

2009 albums
Hitomi albums